Saqqaq (old spelling: Sarqaq) is a settlement in the Avannaata municipality in western Greenland. Founded in 1755 as Solsiden, Saqqaq had 132 inhabitants in 2020. The village's Kalaallisut name is a translation of the Danish meaning "Sunny Side", in reference to its position relative to Livets Top.

It is the site name for the Saqqaq culture.

Geography 
It is located in the southwestern part of the Nuussuaq Peninsula, on the northern shore of Sullorsuaq Strait, northwest of Ilulissat. Immediately northeast of Saqqaq is the Livets Top mountain (1150 m).

History 

Archaeological excavations in Qilakitsoq on the other side of Nuussuaq Peninsula on the shores of Uummannaq Fjord revealed the existence of an ancient Arctic culture, later named the Saqqaq culture, which inhabited the area of west-central Greenland between 2500 BCE and 800 BCE.

Recent DNA samples from human hair suggest that the ancient Saqqaq people came from Siberia about 5,500 years ago and independent of the migration that gave rise to the modern Native Americans and the Inuit.

Transport 
Air Greenland serves the village as part of government contract, with winter-only helicopter flights between Saqqaq Heliport and Ilulissat Airport. Settlement flights in the Disko Bay are unique in that they are operated only during winter and spring.

During summer and autumn, when the waters of the bay are navigable, communication between settlements is by sea only, serviced by Diskoline. The ferry links Saqqaq with Qeqertaq, Oqaatsut, and Ilulissat.

Population 
The population of Saqqaq has increased by 60 percent relative to the 1990 levels, stabilizing in the following decade. Saqqaq is one of the very few demographically stable settlements in the Disko Bay region.

References

External links 
 Historical images from Saqqaq 
 Saqqaq projectile points, National Museum of the American Indian

Villages of Ilulissat
Disko Bay
Populated places in Greenland
Populated places of Arctic Greenland
1755 establishments in North America